This is a list of lakes in Nova Scotia.

Cape Breton Island

All Four Counties
 Bras d'Or Lake

Cape Breton Regional Municipality

Anse aux Cannes Pond 
The Barachois 
Bear Cove Pond 
Bear Gulch Ponds 
Beaverdam Pond 
Belle Lake 
Bennetts Pond 
Big Pond 
Blacketts Lake 
Bluff Lake 
Boom Pond 
Boutellier Lake 
Bray Lake 
Buscombe Lake 
Campbells Pond 
Canoe Lake 
Catalone Lake 
Cavanaghs Lake 
Cochran Lake 
Copper Lake 
Cranberry Pond 
Cusack Lake 
Danny MacDonalds Lake 
Deadman Lake 
Dixon Lake 
Dixons Lake 
Ducker Lake 
Dumaresq Lake 
Ferguson Lake 

Fiddlers Lake 
Fieldings Lake 
First Dodds Lake 
French Village Lake 
Gabarus Lake 
Goose Lake 
Grants Hill Lake 
Grants Old Lake 
Gull Lake 
Hardys Lake 
Little Ferguson Lake 
Little MacLeod Lake 
Lower MacLeod Lake 
MacInnis Lake 
MacIntyre Lake 
MacIsaacs Lake 
MacLeod Lake 
MacMullin Lake 
MacPherson Lake 
Marsh Lake 
Shibinette Lakes 
Slatterys Lake 
Stewarts Lake 
Sugar Loaf Lakes 
Tank Pond 
Taylors Ponds 
The Three Ponds 
Three Stone Lake 
Twelve Mile Lake 
Upper Barachois Lake 
Willis Lake 
Winging Point Lake

Inverness County
Lake Ainslie 
Beaver Lake 
Ballams Pond 
 Beaver Dam Lake 
Black Charlies Lake 
Black Lakes 
Brileys Lake 
Company Lake 
Little Beaver Lakes 
Livingstones Lakes 
MacArthurs Lake 
MacAskills Lake 
MacDonalds Lake 
MacGregors Lake 
MacIntyre Lake 
MacRaes Lakes

Richmond County
Buchanan Lake 
Donnellys Lake 
First Lake 
Hill Lake 
Lauchlin Lake 
Loch Lomond 
MacMillan Lakes 
McCarthys Lake 
McDonald Lake 
Middle Lake 
Willis Lake

Victoria County

Artemise Lake 
Beaver Lake 
Big Lake 
Black Lake 
Boot Lake 
Boyd Lake 
Breton Cove Pond 
Camerons Lakes 
Canns Lake 
Caribou Lakes 
Chéticamp Flowage 
Clyburn Lake 

Dauphiney Lake 
Dundas Lakes 
Fenton Lake 
Flint Lake 
French River Lakes 
Freshwater Lake 
Gisborne Flowage 
McMillan Flowage 
South Lake 
Three Mile Lake 
Two Island Lake 
Wreck Cove Flowage

Halifax Regional Municipality

 A Lake 
Acadia Lake 
 Albro Lake 
 Anderson Lake- Bedford 
 Anderson Lake -Hammond Plains 
 Ash Lake 
 Ash Lake 
 Ash Lake 
 Ash Lake 
 Ash Hill Lake 
 Back Rocky Lake 
 Lake Banook 
 Baptizing Lake, Nova Scotia 
 Bare Rock Lake 
 Barrett Lake 
 Bayers Lake 
 Bear Lake 
 Beaverbank Lake 
 Beckwith Lake 
 Beckwood Lake 
 Bell Lake 
 Bell Lake 
 Big Horseshoe Lake 
 Birch Lake 
 Birch Cove Lake 
 Bissett Lake 
 Black Lake - 1 of 5 total 
 Black Lake - 2 of 5 
 Black Lake - 3 of 5 
 Black Lake - 4 of 5 
 Black Lake - 5 of 5 
 Blakeney Lake 
 Blueberry Lake 
 Boot Lake 
 Bottle Lake 
 Brandy Lake 
 Bug Lake 
 Campbell Lake 
 Camphill Lake 
 Caribou Lake 
 Carter Lake 
 Catcha Lake
 Crotched Lake 
 Lake Charles 
 Lake Charlotte 
 Chapman Lake 
 Chocolate Lake- Armdale 
 Chocolate Lake -Moser River 
 Colpitt Lake 
 Cow Bay Lake 
Cox Lake 
 Coxs Lake 
 Dark Lake- Enfield 
 Dark Lake -Devon 
 De Said Lake 
 Doctors Lake 
 East Little Paul Lake 
 Lake Echo 
 Egg Lake 
 Enchanted Lake 
 Feely Lake 
 Fenerty Lake 
 Lake Fletcher 
 First Chain Lake 
 Fox Lake 
 Fox Lake 
 Fox Lake 
 Frenchman Lake 
 Frog Lake 
 Frog Lake 
 Frying Pan Hole 
 Golden Lake 
 Governor Lake 
 Governor Lake Lakeside 
 Green Lake 
 Goose Lakes
 Halfway Lake 
 Hamilton Lake 
 Hamilton Lake 
 Hamilton Lake 
 Hatchet Lake 
 Haunted Lake 
 Hawkin Hall Lake 
 Henry Lake 
 Hobsons Lake 
 Hill Lake 
 Holland Marsh Lake 
 Holman Marsh Lake 
 Hurley Lake 
 Jack Lake 
 Kearney Lake 
 Kelly Lake 
 Kelly Lake 
 Kelly Long Lake 
 Kidston Lake 
 King Lake 
 Kinsac Lake 
 Lemont Lake 

 Little Albro Lake 
 Little Cranberry Lake 
 Little Cranberry Lake 
 Little Cranberry Lake 
 Little Pockwock Lake 
 Little Red Trout Lake 
 Lizard Lake near Hammonds Plains 
 Lizard Lake on the Chebucto Peninsula 
 Lizard Lake in Wellington at 
 Lizard Lake in Fletchers Lake 
 Lizard Lake in Timberlea 
 Lovett Lake 
 Lookout Lake 
 Lower Marsh Lake 
 Major Lake 
 Maple Lake 
 Marsh Lake 
 Marsh Lake 
 Martin Lake 
 Maynard Lake 
 McCabe Lake 
 Lake Mic Mac 
 Miller Lake in Fall River 
 Miller Lake 
 Moon Lake 
 Morris Lake 
Mountain Lake 
 Murphys Black Duck Lake 
 Niagara Lake 
 Nelson Lake 
 Newcombe Lake 
 Oak Lake 
 Oak Lake 
 Oak Hill Lake 
 Oak Hill Lake 
 Oak Hill Lake 
 Oat Hill Lake 
 Obrien Lake 
 Obrien Lake 
 Porters Lake 
 Porcupine Lake
 Quarry Lake  Halifax 
 Quarry Lake Chebucto Peninsula 
 Queen Lake 
 Paul Lake (Nova Scotia) 
 Perry Lake 
 Phillips Boot Lake 
 Pockwock Lake 
 Powder Mill Lake 
 Rabbit Lake 
 Ragged Lake 
 Ragged Lake 
 Ragged Lake 
 Rasley Lake 
 Red Bridge Pond 
 Second Chain Lake 
 Seal Cove Lake 
 Settle Lake 
 Schmidt Lake 
 Shingle Lake 
 Shubenacadie Grand Lake 
 Six Mile Lake 
 Soldier Lake 
 South Lake 
 Spectacle Lake
 Springfield Lake 
 Square Lake
 Squirrel Lake 
 Stillwater Lake 
 Sullivan Lake 
 Sullivans Pond 
 Tangier Grand Lake 
 Tangier Island Pond 
 Tangier Lake 
 Taylor Lake 
 Ten Mile Lake 
 Three Mile Lake 
 Three Mile Lake 
 Timber Lake 
 Thomas Lake 
 Third Lake
 Three Finger Lake 
 Tomahawk Lake 
 Topsail Lake 
 Trout Lake 
 Tucker Lake 
 Turf Lake 
 Twin Lakes 
 Wallace Lake Sable Island 
 Washmill Lake 
 Webber Lake 
 Webber Lake 
 West Little Paul Lake 
 Williams Lake 
 Williams Lake 
 Williams Lake 
 Willis Lake 
 Wilson Lake 
 Upper Holman Marsh Lake 
 Upper Marsh Lake

Annapolis County

 Beaver Lakes 
 Big Molly Upsim Lake
 Carter Lake 
 Dean Lake 
 Hill Lake 
 Folly Lake 
 Frog Lake 
 Kelly Lake 
 Kejimikujik Lake 
 Little Cranberry Lake 
 Little Grand Lake 
 Springfield Lake 
 Thomas Lake

Antigonish County

 Big Loch 
 Greendale Loch 
 Malignant Cove Pond 
 Monks Head Pond 
 North Lake 
 Pomquet Lake 
 South Lake 
 Vincents Lake

Colchester County
 Bear Lake
 Blakeney Lake 
 Carter Lake 
 Dean Lake 
 Folly Lake (Colchester) 
 Frog Lake 
 Hattie Lake 
 Nelson Lake 
 Pictou Lake 
 Slack Lake 
 Stevens Lake

Cumberland County

 Black Lake (Nova Scotia) 
 Black Lake (Nova Scotia) 
 Barber Lake 
 Goose Lake
 Hart Lake 
 Newville Lake 
 Taylor Lake 
 Williams Lake

Digby County

Municipality of Clare
 Ash Lake 
 Briar Lake 
 Second Briar Lake

Municipality of the District of Digby
 Little Cranberry Lake 
 Ninth Lake 
 Obrien Lake 
 Porters Lake

Guysborough County

Municipality of the District of Guysborough
 Frog Lake 
 Boggy Lake 
 Boggy Lake 
 Greenwood Lake 
 Goose Lake 
 Goose Harbour Lake 
 Hart Lake 
 Hart Lake 
 Hattie Lake 
 Hattie Lake 
 Hattie Lakes 
 Kelly Lake 
 King Lake 
 Lake Charles 
 Indian Harbour Lake 

 Jordan Lake 
 Hay Marsh Lake 
 Miller Lake 
 Miller Lake 
 Morris Lake 
 Second Cow Lake 
 Stevens Lake 
 Oak Hill Lake 
 Oak Hill Lake 
 Taylor Lake 
 Sherbrooke Lake 
 Three Mile Lake 
 Wallace Lake

Municipality of the District of Saint Mary's

 Ash Lake 
Lake Henry 
Long Marsh Lake 
Marsh Lake

Hants County

Municipality of East Hants

 Little Grand Lake 
 Nelson Lake 
 Soldier Lake 
 Wallace Lake

Municipality of the District of West Hants

 King Lake 
 Lizard Lake 
 Miller Lake 
 Panuke Lake 
 South Lake 
 Taylor Lake

Lunenburg County

Municipality of the District of Lunenburg
 Big Mushamush Lake 
 Fox Lake 
 Marsh Lake

Municipality of the District of Chester
 Anderson Lake 
Goose Lake 
 Henry Lake 
 Maple Lake 
 Bear Marsh Lake 
 Nine Mile Lake 
 Second Bog Lake 
 Sherbrooke Lake 
 Yellow Marsh Lake

Kings County
 Aylesford Lake 
 Fox Lake 
 Gaspereau Lake 
 Hamilton Lake 
 Lake George 
 Tomahawk Lake

Pictou County

 Beaver Lake 
 Beaver Lake 
 Black Lake 1 of 4 named ,
 Black Lake 2 of 4 
 Black Lake 3 of 4 
 Black Lake 4 of 4 
 Dryden Lake 
 Ellen Brown Lake 
 Forbes Lake (Pictou County) 
 Maple Lake 
 Robertsons Lake 
 Taylor Lake

Region of Queens Municipality

 Beaver Lake 
 Beaver Lake 
 Black Lake 
 Hog Lake 
 Lake Rossignol 
 McGowan Lake 
 Robertsons Lake
 Second Beaverdam Lake 
 Second Beaver Lake 
 Second Christopher Lake 
 Ten Mile Lake 
 Tobeatic Lake 
 Willis Lake

Shelburne County

Municipality of Barrington
 Barrington Lake 
 Beaver Lake 
 Goose Lake 
 Musquash Lake 
 Oak Park Lake

Municipality of the District of Shelburne
 Greenwood Lake 
 Jordan Lake 
 Lily Pond 
 Little Harbour Lake 
 Long Beach Pond 
 Little Lake 
 Porterfield Lakes 
 Sodom Lake 
 Swims Iceponds 
 Robs Lake 
 Walls Lake 
 Wallace Lake

Yarmouth County

Municipalite Argyle Municipality
 East Goose Lake 
 Gavels Lake 
 Goose Lake (Argyle) 
 Great Barren Lake 
 Great Pubnico Lake 
 Hog Lake 
 Kings Lake 
 Middle Lakes 
 Second Bear Lake

Municipality of the District of Yarmouth

 Lake Annis 
 Beaver Lake 
 Doctors Lake 
 Goose Lake 
 Halfway Lake 
 Lake Milo 
 Raynards Lake 
 Second Chub Lake 
 Second Lake 
 Lake Vaughan

See also

Beaver Lake
Crooked Lake
Cranberry Lake
Duck Lake
Flat Lake
Fourth Lake
Grand Lake
Hatchet Lake
Juniper Lake
Lewis Lake
Little Lake
Long Lake
Molega Lake
Oak Lake
Otter Lake
River Lake
Rocky Lake
Russell Lake
Sandy Lake
Second Lake
Spectacle Lake
Third Lake
Whites Lake

References

Geographical Names Board of Canada
Geonames.org
Explore HRM
Nova Scotia Placenames
 Nova Scotia Lake Survey List

Lakes
Nova Scotia